Balearic horse is a horse breed or breeds originating in the Balearic Islands.  A number of works include a breed entry or grouping called the "Balearic horse" or "Balearic pony." However, these sources are unclear what specific breeds are in this grouping and may or may not include the following breeds found in these islands:

 The Mallorquín horse
 The Menorquín horse
 The Spanish Trotter

References

Horse breeds
Balearic culture